

Albums

Studio albums

Collaborations

Live albums

Compilation albums

Other appearances

Singles

Music videos

 
Country music discographies
Discographies of American artists